Lasagna Cat is a web series created by Fatal Farm as a parody of the Garfield comic strips created by American cartoonist Jim Davis. The series was uploaded to YouTube in 2008 and 2017, and consists mainly of humorous live-action recreations of classic Garfield comics.

Format 
The majority of Lasagna Cat consists of live-action reenactments of Garfield, with each reenactment followed by an absurd "interlude" segment. Most of the series' videos are only a few minutes long, with the exception of "07/27/1978" and "Sex Survey Results", which are one and five hours long, respectively. The series exists mainly to criticize the original Garfield comics' style of humor and as a tribute to its creator, Jim Davis.

Episodes

Season 1 (2008)

Season 2 (2017)

Reception 
Lasagna Cat was well received, with reviewers praising its insight into Garfield and comedy in general. It has been seen as a part of the widespread trend of "weird" Garfield internet memes, with Smithsonian in particular citing it as an example of people who "have taken up the challenge of making Garfield funny."

A popular parody Twitter account was created in response to "07/27/1978", an hour-long episode (set to Philip Glass' score to the 1997 film Kundun) in which actor John Blyth Barrymore philosophically monologues about his adoration and obsession with a Garfield strip published on the titular date. Additionally, the series was cited as an inspiration in the creation of the Adult Swim short Too Many Cooks.

References

External links 

 
 

2000s YouTube series
American comedy web series
YouTube channels launched in 2007
Garfield
2010s YouTube series
2008 web series debuts
2017 web series endings